The Lehi Main Street Historic District is a  historic district in Lehi, Utah, United States, that was listed on the National Register of Historic Places (NRHP).

Description
The district includes work dating from 1891, and includes Italianate and Gothic architecture.  The listing included 19 contributing buildings.

According to its 1998 NRHP nomination, the district is significant "for its association with and physical representation of Lehi's growth and development through two of the major periods of Lehi's history."

The 19 contributing buildings are:
 4 West Main Street (1910), Cotter's Grocery
 12 West Main Street (1920)
 24/32/36 West Main Street (1915), Racker Block
 40 West Main Street (1934), Jones Dental Office
 46 West Main Street (1901), Dorton Butcher Shop, Mountain States Telephone
 60 West Main Street (1899), Dr. Robert E. Steele
 68 West Main Street (1914), Lehi Banner Office
 72 West Main Street (1898–99), Dr. E.G. Merrihew
 98 West Main Street (1900), Merrihew Drug Store/State Bank of Lehi, separately NRHP-listed in 1982
 101 West Main Street (1893), Lehi Slaughtering Company Meat Market
 116 West Main Street (1891), Comer/Knight/Hosier Saloon
 120 West Main Street (1893–94), Dorton Brother's Meat Market
 155 West Main Street (1903), Log Cabin Saloon, Larsen's Market
 162 West Main Street (1919), Lehi Drug Store, Rose Cabaret
 164 West Main Street (1929), Hertell Building
 169 West Main Street (1891), Senate Saloon, Lehi Public Library
 181 West Main Street (1912), Racker Mercantile
 189 West Main Street (1900), Racker Mercantile
 51 North Center Street (1918–26), Lehi City Hall

See also

 National Register of Historic Places listings in Utah County, Utah

References

External links

Gothic Revival architecture in Utah
Italianate architecture in Utah
Historic districts in Utah County, Utah
Buildings and structures in Lehi, Utah
Historic districts on the National Register of Historic Places in Utah
National Register of Historic Places in Utah County, Utah